John Needham (4 March 1887 – 1961) was an English professional footballer who scored 63 goals in 225 appearances in the Football League playing for Birmingham, Wolverhampton Wanderers and Hull City.

Career
Needham was born in Newstead, Nottinghamshire. He began his football career with local clubs before attracting attention with his goalscoring exploits for Mansfield Wesley of the Notts & District League. His 46 goals in 35 games, including four goals in a match on four occasions and three more hat-tricks, in the 1908–09 season earned him a move to Birmingham of the Football League Second Division. He made his debut for the club on 2 October 1909 in a 2–1 home defeat to Leeds City, and played in about half of that season's games, scoring five goals in a poor side which finished bottom of the League.

Despite a good start to his Birmingham career, Needham was allowed to leave for fellow Second Division club Wolverhampton Wanderers in time to score on his debut in the last game of the 1909–10 season, the winning goal in a 3–2 defeat of Manchester City on 30 April 1910. He and Sammy Brooks formed an excellent partnership on the left side of Wolves' attack, and in all competitions Needham scored 61 goals in more than 200 appearances.

During the First World War he guested for Port Vale, becoming the club's top scorer during the 1916–17 season with 12 goals. He showed his "true regard for the game" by playing a match after working the previous night until 6am. After being conscripted into the army in the summer of 1917 he returned to Wolverhampton upon his demobilisation. He left in March 1920 to join Hull City, and later played in the Midland League for Scunthorpe & Lindsey United.

Personal life
Needham married Sarah Shelton, the widow of his former Wolves teammate Jack Shelton.

Career statistics
Source:

References

1887 births
People from Newstead, Nottinghamshire
Footballers from Nottinghamshire
1961 deaths
English footballers
Association football forwards
Mansfield Town F.C. players
Birmingham City F.C. players
Wolverhampton Wanderers F.C. players
Hull City A.F.C. players
Scunthorpe United F.C. players
English Football League players
Port Vale F.C. wartime guest players
British Army personnel of World War I
Place of death missing
Military personnel from Nottinghamshire